The imperial election of 1138 was an imperial election held to select the emperor of the Holy Roman Empire.  It took place in Koblenz on 7 March.

Conrad III of Germany was named Holy Roman Emperor as a result of the election.

1138
1138 in the Holy Roman Empire
12th-century elections
Non-partisan elections